Elections to the Moray Council were held on 3 May 2012, the same day as the other 31 local authorities in Scotland. The election used the eight wards created under the Local Governance (Scotland) Act 2004, with 26 councillors being elected. Each ward elected either 3 or 4 members, using the STV electoral system.

The election saw the Scottish National Party increase their representation by 1 seat, equalling the seat numbers of the Independents who lost 2 seats, while becoming the largest party on the Council in terms of vote share. The Scottish Conservative and Unionist Party retained their 3 seats while the Scottish Labour Party gained an additional seat.

Following the election a coalition was formed between the Independents and the Conservatives which was a continuance of the arrangement from 2007 to 2012.

Election summary

Note: "Votes" are the first preference votes. The net gain/loss and percentage changes relate to the result of the previous Scottish local elections on 3 May 2007. This may differ from other published sources showing gain/loss relative to seats held at dissolution of Scotland's councils.

Ward results

Speyside Glenlivet
2007: 2xSNP; 1xIndependent
2012: 2xSNP; 1xIndependent
2007-2012 Change: No change

Keith and Cullen
2007: 2xIndependent; 1xSNP
2012: 2xIndependent; 1xSNP
2007-2012 Change: No change

Buckie
2007: 2xIndependent; 1xSNP
2012: 2xIndependent; 1xSNP
2007-2012 Change: No change

Fochabers Lhanbryde
2007: 1xSNP; 1xCon; 1xIndependent
2012: 1xCon; 1xSNP; 1xLab
2007-2012 Change: Lab gain one seat from Independent

Heldon and Laich
2007: 2xIndependent; 1xSNP; 1xCon 
2012: 2xIndependent; 1xSNP; 1xCon
2007-2012 Change: No change

Elgin City North
2007: 1xSNP; 1xLab; 1xIndependent
2012: 2xSNP; 1xLab
2007-2012 Change: SNP gain one seat from Independent

Elgin City South
2007: 1xSNP; 1xLab; 1xIndependent
2012: 1xLab; 1xCon; 1xSNP
2007-2012 Change: Con gain from Independent

Forres
2007: 2xIndependent; 1xSNP; 1xCon
2012: 3xIndependent; 1xSNP
2007-2012 Change: Independent gain one seat from Con

Changes since last election
† Heldon and Laich SNP Cllr Carolle Ralph resigned her seat on 7 December 2012. The by-election was held on 7 March 2013 and was won by the Independent, John Cowe.  
†† Buckie Independent Cllr Anne McKay resigned her seat on 13 November 2013. A by-election was held on 30 January 2014 and was won by the Independent, Gordon Cowie. 
††† Elgin City North Labour Cllr Barry Jarvis resigned his seat on 26 September 2014 to train as a teacher. A by-election was held on 11 December 2014 and the seat was won by the SNP's Kirsty Reid.
†††† Buckie Independent Cllr Joe Mackay died on 12 January 2015 after a fall from his mobility scooter.  A by-election was held to fill the vacancy on 26 March 2015 and the seat was won by the SNP's Sonya Warren.
††††† Heldon and Laich Independent Cllr Eric McGillivray announced on 31 July 2015 he was standing down from the council for personal reasons. A by-election was held on 1 October 2015 and the seat was won by the Independent Dennis Slater.

By-elections since 2012

References

External links
Moray Council Local Government Election 2012

2012
2012 Scottish local elections
21st century in Moray